WLQM-FM is a Full Service formatted broadcast radio station licensed to Franklin, Virginia, serving Western Tidewater.  WLQM-FM is owned and operated by Franklin Broadcasting Corporation.

References

External links
 Real Country 101.7 Online
 

LQM
Country radio stations in the United States
Full service radio stations in the United States
Radio stations established in 1956
1956 establishments in Virginia